The Gap Band has released over 30 albums. Since their inception in 1967,  the Gap Band has released 16 studio albums, 12 compilation albums and 2 live albums.  They released nine self-titled albums (including two of the same name). Each album does not reflect which number they released, only which point it is in the series (Gap Band IV, for example, is actually their sixth album).

Albums

Studio albums

Live albums

Compilation albums

Singles

See also
Charlie Wilson discography

References

Discographies of American artists
Rhythm and blues discographies
Soul music discographies
Funk music discographies